John Cresson Trautwine (March 30, 1810, Philadelphia, Pennsylvania – September 14, 1883, Philadelphia) was an American civil engineer, architect, and engineering writer.

A consultant on numerous canal projects in North and South America, he was later remembered for reporting in 1852 that a canal through Panama would be impossible.

Career
Trautwine began studying civil engineering in the office of William Strickland, an architect and early railroad civil engineer, and helped erect the second building of the United States Mint in Philadelphia.

In 1831, he became a civil engineer with the Columbia Railway. In 1835, under Strickland's direction, he drew one of the earliest maps of Maryland: a proposed route for the Wilmington and Susquehanna Railroad from Wilmington, Delaware, to North East, Maryland. In 1836, he became an engineer with the Philadelphia and Trenton Railroad. From 1836 to 1842, he was an engineer with the Hiawassee Railway, which connected Georgia and Tennessee.

In 1835, Trautwine designed Pennsylvania Hall, the first building erected for Gettysburg College. A "temple-style edifice with four columns in the portico", it was, as of 1958, the only building he was known to have designed.

In 1838, Trautwine once again worked under Strickland, as assistant engineer for the W&S, which had merged with three other railroads to create the first rail link from Philadelphia to Baltimore. (This main line survives today as part of Amtrak's Northeast Corridor.) His service is noted on the 1839 Newkirk Viaduct Monument in Philadelphia.

In 1844, Trautwine was elected as a member to the American Philosophical Society.

He later executed surveys for the Panama Railway in 1850, for the Lackawanna and Lanesborough Railway in Susquehanna County, Pa., in 1856, and for a railway route across Honduras in 1857.

With George Totten, he built the Canal del Dique between the Bay of Cartagena and the Magdalena River in Colombia. He also planned a system of docks for the city of Montreal.

Writings 
Trautwine wrote several engineering texts that became standards in the field. His Civil Engineer's Pocket Book was long known as the "engineer's bible"; it passed through many editions under the later editorship of John Cresson Trautwine, Jr. (1850–1924) and J.C. Trautwine 3rd (1878-1949).

Three of Trautwine's books were among the 16 recommended for students in George Vose's 1872 classic Manual for Railroad Engineers and Engineering Students:
 Method of Calculating the Cubic Contents of Excavations and Embankments (1851)
 Field Practice for Laying out Circular Curves for Railroads (1851)
 Civil Engineer's Pocket-book, 1871 (1904 edition prepared by J. C. Trautwine III)

References

Sources: Huntingfield Map Collection, Maryland State Archive, MSA SC 1399 -1-658

External links
 
 Bio at Philadelphia Buildings
 https://web.archive.org/web/20050221065816/http://www.picturehistory.com/find/p/20642/g/1/mcms.html (photo)
 
 "Guide to the Trautwine Family Papers, 1834-1947" held at Cornell University

Architects from Philadelphia
1810 births
1883 deaths
American civil engineers
American engineering writers
19th-century American architects
Engineers from Pennsylvania